Michael J. Bakalis (born March 23, 1938) is an American academic and politician.  He was the Democratic nominee for Governor of Illinois in 1978, losing to incumbent Republican Governor James R. Thompson.

Bakalis received his bachelor's, master's, and doctoral degrees from Northwestern University in 1959, 1962, and 1966, respectively. His academic career includes service as assistant dean at Northern Illinois University, dean of the School of Education at Loyola University Chicago, and as the President of Triton College. He has also been a member of the faculty at the Kellogg Graduate School of Management at Northwestern University since 1994, where he teaches public and non-profit management, policy, and strategy.

In government and politics, Bakalis served as the Illinois State Superintendent of Education from 1971 to 1975 and as Illinois Comptroller from 1977 to 1979.  Having built a reputation as a staunch advocate of education, in 1978, he won the Democratic nomination for governor. During the election, Bakalis was critical of Thompson's education and tax policies and aggressively courted voters. However, because Thompson was serving an unusual two-year term as governor and so had been in office only nine months when Bakalis began his campaign, Bakalis had difficulty challenging the incumbent's record. Bakalis lost the election with 40% of the vote, as opposed to Thompson's 59%.

After his unsuccessful bid for governorship, Bakalis served as a Deputy Undersecretary in the United States Department of Education of the Jimmy Carter administration from 1980 to 1982, where he administered ten regional offices.

In 1988, he managed the Illinois campaign of Michael Dukakis's bid for the US President. In 2002, Bakalis made another run for governor but had to drop out before the Democratic primary because of a lack of money.

Bakalis is also the founder, President and CEO of American Quality Schools, an education management organization that operates charter schools in the Midwestern United States.

References

Northwestern University faculty
Northern Illinois University faculty
Loyola University Chicago faculty
American school administrators
American people of Greek descent
Northwestern University School of Education and Social Policy alumni
Comptrollers of Illinois
Illinois Democrats
People from Darien, Illinois
1938 births
Living people
People from Berwyn, Illinois
Politicians from Cook County, Illinois
Illinois State Superintendents
American chief executives of education-related organizations